2015 Sanaa mosque bombings may refer to:

March 2015 Sanaa mosque bombings
September 2015 Sanaa mosque bombing